Maxim Ziese (1901-1955) was a German dramatist and writer. Of Pomeranian descent, he served in the First World War. He became a writer after the war, noted for his patriotic 1933 play Siebenstein. He later worked as a dramaturge under Gustaf Gründgens at the Prussian State Theatre.

References

Bibliography 
 Noack, Frank. Veit Harlan: The Life and Work of a Nazi Filmmaker. University Press of Kentucky, 2016.

1901 births
1955 deaths
Writers from Hesse
People from Darmstadt-Dieburg
20th-century German dramatists and playwrights